Niamh McEvoy is a former senior Dublin ladies' footballer. She was a member of the Dublin team that won the 2010 All-Ireland Senior Ladies' Football Championship Final. She was one of two players named Niamh McEvoy who played for Dublin in the 2010 final. The player sharing her name, Niamh McEvoy of St. Sylvester's, replaced her when she came on as a second-half substitute. She had previously played for Dublin in the 2003, 2004 and 2009 All-Ireland finals. McEvoy also captained the Dublin team.

Early years, family and education
Between 1997 and 1999 McEvoy attended Coláiste Íde where she gained a Diploma in Sport and Fitness Administration/Management. Between 2007 and 2011 she attended Dublin City University where she gained a BSc in Physical Education and Biology.

Playing career

Club
At club level, McEvoy played for Parnells and DCU. She was a member of DCU team that won the 2010 O'Connor Cup.

Inter-county
McEvoy was a member of the Dublin team that won the 2010 All-Ireland Senior Ladies' Football Championship Final. She was one of two players named Niamh McEvoy who played for Dublin in the 2010 final. The player sharing her name, Niamh McEvoy of St. Sylvester's, replaced her when she came on as a second-half substitute. She had previously played for Dublin in the 2003, 2004 and 2009 All-Ireland finals. McEvoy also captained the Dublin team.

Lecturer/Coach
While still playing football actively, McEvoy coached young girls at the Gaelic Athletic Association summer camps. Since 2011 McEvoy has worked as a lecturer at Pearse College. Since 2015 she has served as a coach and/or selector with the DCU, Kildare and Dublin ladies' football teams. She has helped coach the Dublin team while the player sharing her name, Niamh McEvoy of St. Sylvester's, has been a member of the team.

Honours
Dublin
All-Ireland Senior Ladies' Football Championship
Winners: 2010: 1
Runner up: 2003, 2004, 2009: 3
 DCU GAA
O'Connor Cup 
Winners: 2009, 2010, 2011: 3 ?

References

Living people
Dublin inter-county ladies' footballers
Parnells Gaelic footballers (Dublin)
DCU ladies' Gaelic footballers
Alumni of Dublin City University
Year of birth missing (living people)